AD 32 (XXXII) was a leap year starting on Tuesday (link will display the full calendar) of the Julian calendar. At the time, it was known as the Year of the Consulship of Ahenobarbus and Camillus (or, less frequently, year 785 Ab urbe condita). The denomination AD 32 for this year has been used since the early medieval period, when the Anno Domini calendar era became the prevalent method in Europe for naming years.

Events 
 Philo writes his symbolic interpretation of the Old Testament (Allegory).

Births 
 28 April – Marcus Salvius Otho, Roman emperor (d. AD 69)
 Ban Chao, Chinese general and diplomat (d. 102)
 Ban Gu, Chinese historian and politician (d. AD 92)

Deaths 
 Cassius Severus, Roman rhetor and writer 
 Decimus Haterius Agrippa, Roman consul
 Lucius Calpurnius Piso, Roman consul  (b. 48 BC)
 John the Baptist, religious figure in Christianity, Islam, and other Abrahamic religions (b. early 1st century BC)

References 

0032

als:30er#32